The Marvel Universe is a fictional shared universe where the stories in most American comic book titles and other media published by Marvel Comics take place. Super-teams such as the Avengers, the X-Men, the Fantastic Four, the Guardians of the Galaxy, and many Marvel superheroes live in this universe, including characters such as Spider-Man, Captain America, Iron Man, Thor, the Hulk, Ant-Man, the Wasp, Wolverine, Black Panther, Doctor Strange, Daredevil, and Captain Marvel, Blade, Black Widow, Hawkeye, among numerous others.  It also contains well-known supervillains such as Doctor Doom, Magneto, Ultron, Thanos, Loki, The Green Goblin, Kang the Conqueror, Red Skull, The Kingpin, Doctor Octopus, Carnage, Apocalypse, Dormammu, Mysterio,  Electro, and the Vulture. It also contains antiheroes such as Venom, Namor, Deadpool, Silver Sable, Ghost Rider, The Punisher, and  Black Cat.

The Marvel Universe is further depicted as existing within a "multiverse" consisting of thousands of separate universes, all of which are the creations of Marvel Comics and all of which are, in a sense, "Marvel universes". In this context, "Marvel Universe" is taken to refer to the mainstream Marvel continuity, which is known as Earth-616 or currently as Prime Earth.

History

Some of Timely Comics (the 1930s and '40s predecessor to Marvel Comics) characters coexisted in the same world was first established in Marvel Mystery Comics #7 (1940) where Namor was mentioned in Human Torch's story, and vice versa. Later several superheroes (who starred in separate stories in the series up to that point) met each other in a group dubbed the All-Winners Squad.
 
Though the concept of a shared universe was not new or unique to comic books in 1961, writer/editor Stan Lee, together with several artists including Jack Kirby and Steve Ditko, created a series of titles where events in one book would have repercussions in another title and serialized stories would show characters' growth and change. Headline characters in one title would make cameos or guest appearances in other books. Fantastic Four #12 is the first crossover comic book in modern Marvel continuity (first meeting of Fantastic Four and the Hulk). Eventually, many of the leading heroes (Ant-Man, Wasp, Iron Man, Thor and the Hulk) assembled into a team known as the Avengers, which debuted in September 1963.  This was not the first time that Marvel's characters had interacted with one another—Namor the Sub-Mariner and the original Human Torch had been rivals when Marvel was Timely Comics (Marvel Vault), under editor Martin Goodman — but it was the first time that the comic book publisher's characters seemed to share a world.  The Marvel Universe was also notable for setting its central titles in New York City; by contrast, many DC heroes live in fictional cities. Care was taken to portray the city and the world as realistically as possible, with the presence of superhumans affecting the common citizens in various ways.

Over time, a few Marvel Comics writers lobbied Marvel editors to incorporate the idea of a Multiverse resembling DC's parallel worlds; this plot device allows one to create several fictional universes which normally do not overlap. What happens on Earth in the main Marvel Universe would normally not affect what happens on a parallel Earth in another Marvel-created universe. However, writers would have the creative ability to write stories in which people from one such universe would visit this alternative universe.

In 1982, Marvel published the miniseries Contest of Champions, in which all of the major heroes in existence at the time were gathered together to deal with one threat.  This was Marvel's first miniseries.  Each issue contained biographical information on many major costumed characters; these biographies were a precursor to Marvel's series of reference material, The Official Handbook of the Marvel Universe, which followed shortly on the heels of Contest of Champions.

Concepts

The Marvel Universe is strongly based on the real world. Earth in the Marvel Universe has all the features of the real one: same countries, same personalities (politicians, movie stars, etc.), same historical events (such as World War II), and so on; however, it also contains many other fictional elements: countries such as Wakanda and Latveria (very small nations) and organizations like the espionage agency S.H.I.E.L.D. and its enemies, HYDRA and A.I.M. In 2009 Marvel officially described its world's geography in a two-part miniseries, the Marvel Atlas.

Most importantly, the Marvel Universe also incorporates examples of almost all major science fiction and fantasy concepts, with writers adding more continuously. Aliens, gods, magic, cosmic powers and extremely advanced human-developed technology all exist prominently in the Marvel Universe. (A universe incorporating all these types of fantastic elements is fairly rare; another example is the DC Universe.)  Monsters also play a more prominent role with east Asian origins of magical incantation, outlandish sorcery and manifesting principle in the Marvel Universe. One such case is Fin Fang Foom arising from the ashes of tantric magic. Thanks to these extra elements, Earth in the Marvel Universe is home to a large number of superheroes and supervillains, who have gained their powers by any of these means. The general public is so familiar with such concepts that Empire State University has a scholarship for "aliens, dimensional travelers, clones, independent machine intelligences and other students outside the norm", businesses and residences have superhero property insurance and bookmakers take bets on their battles' outcomes, and New York air traffic controllers handle starships landing at local airports.

Comparatively, little time passes in the Marvel Universe compared to the real world, owing to the serial nature of storytelling, with the stories of certain issues picking up mere seconds after the conclusion of the previous one, while a whole month has passed by in "real-time". Marvel's major heroes were created in the 1960s, but the amount of time that has passed between then and now within the universe itself has (after a prolonged period of being identified as about 10 years in the mid-to-late 1990s) most recently been identified as 13 years. Consequently, the settings of some events which were contemporary when written have to be updated every few years to "make sense" in this floating timeline. Thus, the events of previous stories are considered to have happened within a certain number of years before the publishing date of the current issue. For example, Spider-Man's high school graduation was published in Amazing Spider-Man #28 (September 1965), his college graduation in Amazing Spider-Man #185 (October 1978), and his high school reunion in Marvel Knights Spider-Man #7 (December 2004). Because of the floating timeline, where stories refer to real-life historic events, these references are later ignored or rewritten to suit current sensibilities; for instance, the origin of Iron Man was changed in a 2004 storyline to refer to the War on Terror in Afghanistan, whereas the original Iron Man stories had referred to the Vietnam War in Vietnam; similarly, The Punisher's backstory has also been changed as well.

Marvel Comics itself exists as a company within the Marvel Universe, and versions of people such as Stan Lee and Jack Kirby have appeared in some of the stories, whereas characters like Steve Rogers, (Captain America's alter ego), have worked for Marvel. The Marvel of this reality publishes comics that adapt the actual adventures of the superheroes (except for details not known to the public, like their secret identities); many of these are licensed with the permission of the heroes themselves, who customarily donate their share of profits to charity. Additionally, the DC Comics Universe is also said to exist in the Marvel Universe as one of the many alternative universes. The reverse may also be said concerning the DC Universe. This is one method of explaining the various crossover stories co-published by the two companies.

Pop culture characters such as Sherlock Holmes, Dracula and the Frankenstein Monster exist in the Marvel Universe. This is usually justified as a second-hand account of events as told to credited authors Sir Arthur Conan Doyle, Bram Stoker and Mary Shelley, although the general public continues to believe them to be fictional. Robert E. Howard's Conan the Barbarian, Red Sonja, Kull the Conqueror, and Solomon Kane also have real-life existences in the Marvel Universe. The Hyborian Era of Conan and Kull is considered part of Earth-616 pre-recorded history. However, they rarely encounter modern Marvel superhero characters.  This is most likely possible due to the uncertain legal status of Howard's works before 2006 when they became public domain. As of 2019, Conan the Barbarian, as well as Kull the Conqueror and Solomon Kane, have been firmly integrated, thanks to Marvel regaining the publishing rights to the characters. Other licensed works that have been incorporated into the Marvel Universe include Godzilla, the Transformers, the film 2001: A Space Odyssey (in the character of Machine Man), Rom the Spaceknight, the Micronauts, and the Shogun Warriors. In most cases, such material is either restricted from use after the license expires or the characters redesigned or renamed to avoid copyright infringement.

Costumed superheroes and supervillains
Within the fictional history of the Marvel Universe, the tradition of using costumed secret identities to fight or commit evil had long existed, but it came into prominence during the days of the American "Wild West" with heroes such as Carter Slade/the Phantom Rider. During the 20th century, the tradition was reinvigorated by Steve Rogers/Captain America and the Invaders in the 1940s, who fought for the Allies of World War II.

Unlike the DC Universe, few of Marvel's Golden Age characters have risen to prominence in modern publications; Captain America is one exception, and to a lesser extent, his contemporary, Namor the Sub-Mariner, primarily because both of these characters were reintroduced to readers and the Marvel Universe during the 1960s.

Marvel's most prominent heroes were created during the Silver Age of Comic Books in the 1960s to early 1970s, including Peter Parker/Spider-Man, Tony Stark/Iron Man, Thor, Bruce Banner/the Hulk, Stephen Strange/Doctor Strange, Matt Murdock/Daredevil, Ant-Man and the Wasp (Hank Pym and Janet van Dyne), Natasha Romanoff/the Black Widow, Clint Barton/Hawkeye, Pietro Maxmioff/Quicksilver, Wanda Maximoff/the Scarlet Witch, the Vision, Simon Williams/Wonder Man, Hercules, Kevin Plunder/Ka-Zar, Groot, Nick Fury, T'Challa/the Black Panther, Mar-Vell (the first Captain Marvel), Carol Danvers (also known as the first Ms. Marvel, Binary, Warbird, and the current Captain Marvel), Sam Wilson/the Falcon, Dane Whitman/the Black Knight, Norrin Radd/the Silver Surfer, Jane Foster (also known as the second Thor), Warren Worthington III/the Angel-Archangel, Hank McCoy/the Beast, Scott Summers/Cyclops, Robert "Bobby" Drake/the Iceman, Jean Grey (also known as Marvel Girl and Phoenix), Charles Xavier/Professor X, Lorna Dane/Polaris, Alex Summers/Havok, Sean Cassidy/the Banshee, Reed Richards/Mister Fantastic, Susan Storm/the Invisible Woman, Johnny Storm/the Human Torch, Ben Grimm/the Thing, Brunnhilde/the Valkyrie, the Inhumans (composed of Blackagar Boltagon, Medusalith Amaquelin-Boltagon, Crystalia Amaquelin-Boltagon/Crystal, Gorgon, Karnak Mandel-Azur/Karnak the Shatterer, Triton and Lockjaw) and Alexi Shostakov/the Red Guardian.

Other notable heroes from the Bronze Age and Modern Age from the early-to-mid 1970s to the early 1990s include James "Logan" Howlett/Wolverine, Ororo Munroe/Storm, Piotr "Peter" Rasputin/Colossus, Kurt Wagner/Nightcrawler, Luke Cage (also known as Power-Man), Danny Rand/Iron Fist, Misty Knight, Colleen Wing, Barbara "Bobbi" Morse/Mockingbird, the White Tiger (Hector Ayala), Shang-Chi, Greer Grant Nelson/Tigra, Jessica Drew (also known as Spider-Woman), the Ghost Rider (Johnny Blaze), Daimon Hellstrom, Satana Hellstrom, Theodore "Ted" Sallis/the Man-Thing, Eric Brooks/Blade the Vampire-Slayer, Michael Morbius/Morbius the Living Vampire, Howard the Duck, Monica Rambeau (also known as Photon, Pulsar, Spectrum and the second Captain Marvel), Moondragon, Drax the Destroyer, Peter Quill/Star-Lord, Gamora, Rocket Raccoon, Frank Castle/the Punisher, Marc Spector/the Moon Knight, the Eternals (composed of Ikaris, Thena, Ajak, Makkari, Kingo, Phastos, Gilgamesh and Sprite), War Machine, Nova (Richard Rider), Adam Warlock, Power Pack, Betsy Braddock, Scott Lang (the second Ant-Man), Felicia Hardy/the Black Cat, Silver Sable, Katherine "Kitty" Pryde (also known as Shadowcat, Ariel, Sprite, Star-Lord and the Red Queen), Emma Frost (also known as the White Queen), Jennifer Walters/the She-Hulk, Tyrone Johnson/Cloak and Tandy Bowen/Dagger, Brian Braddock/Captain Britain, Doreen Green/Squirrel Girl, Elektra Natchios, the New Mutants (composed of Illyana Rasputin/Magik, Xi'an Coy Minh/Karma, Danielle Moonstar/Mirage, Sam Guthrie/Cannonball, Rahne Sinclair/Wolfsbane, Doug Ramsey/Cypher, Warlock and others), the New Warriors, David Haller/Legion, John Proudstar/Warpath-Thunderbird, Anna Marie LeBeau/Rogue and Jubilation Lee/Jubilee.

Some of Marvel's more recent creations from the mid-to-late 1990s, 2000s and 2010s, such as Wade Wilson/Deadpool, Remy LeBeau/Gambit, Nathan Summers/Cable, Neena Thurman/Domino, Clarice Fong/Blink, the Thunderbolts, Yelena Belova (also known as the second Black Widow), the Runaways, the modern Guardians of the Galaxy, the modern Defenders (based on the Netflix MCU version of the same name), Laura Kinney/X-23 (a.k.a. the second Wolverine), Shuri, the Dora Milaje, Daisy Johnson (also known as Quake), Phil Coulson, Melinda May, Bucky Barnes/the Winter Soldier, Maria Hill, Miles Morales (the second Spider-Man of the Ultimate Marvel Universe), Hope van Dyne (also known as the Red Queen and the second Wasp), Cassandra Lang (also known as Stature, Stinger, Ant-Girl and Giant-Girl), the Stepford Cuckoos, Amadeus Cho (also known as the second Hulk), Kamala Khan (also known as the second Ms. Marvel), Kate Bishop (also known as the third Hawkeye), Lunaella Lafayette/Moon Girl, America Chavez (also known as the second Miss America), Robbie Reyes (also known as the fourth Ghost Rider), Riri Williams/Ironheart and Spider-Gwen (Gwen Stacy of Earth-65) have become popular characters in their own right.

Prominent teams of superheroes include the Avengers, the X-Men, the Fantastic Four, the Defenders, the Inhumans, S.H.I.E.L.D., the Howling Commandos, the Guardians of the Galaxy, the Runaways, the Midnight Sons and the Thunderbolts. All these groups have varying lineups; the Avengers have included Marvel's major heroes as members at one time or another. The X-Men are a team of mutants led by Professor X and include many of Marvel's most popular characters, such as Wolverine and others. The Fantastic Four are viewed as "Marvel's First Family" of superheroes, usually consisting of Mister Fantastic, the Invisible Woman, the Human Torch and the Thing, as well as siblings Franklin and Valeria Richards. The Defenders were an ad hoc team usually brought together by Doctor Strange which has included the Hulk, Namor the Sub-Mariner and the Silver Surfer, while the most recent incarnation of the team consists of street-level New York City heroes Daredevil, Jessica Jones, Luke Cage and Iron Fist. The Guardians of the Galaxy include Marvel's cosmic characters such as Adam Warlock, Star-Lord, Gamora, Drax the Destroyer, Rocket Raccoon and Groot, but the team has also introduced other heroes into the roster such as Kitty Pryde, the Silver Surfer, the Thing and Nova. The Inhumans are a royal family consisting of Black Bolt, Medusa, Crystal, Gorgon, Triton, Karnak and Lockjaw, who rule the city of Attilan. The Runaways are a group of teenagers and a dinosaur consisting of Alex Wilder, Nico Minoru, Karolina Dean, Chase Stein, Molly Hayes, Gert Yorkes and Old Lace who rebel against their evil parents known as the Pride. The Midnight Sons consist of supernatural heroes such as Blade, Ghost Rider, Moon Knight, Elsa Bloodstone, Hellstrom, the Werewolf and the Man-Thing. The Thunderbolts' original incarnation were supervillains disguised as superheroes consisting of Citizen V (a.k.a. Helmut Zemo), MACH-IV (a.k.a. the Beetle), Songbird (a.k.a. Screaming Mimi), Moonstone (a.k.a. Meteorite), Techno/the Ogre (a.k.a. the Fixer) and Jolt, while the current incarnation of the team is made up of reformed supervillains/anti-heroes working for the government: Deadpool, the Punisher, the Red Hulk, the Winter Soldier and the Ghost. Although teams of supervillains are few and far between, notable examples include the Masters of Evil, the Emissaries of Evil, the Brotherhood of Mutants, the Sinister Six, the Frightful Four, the Lethal Legion, the Legion of the Unliving, the Black Order, the Annihilation Wave, and the Cabal.

Origin of superhuman powers
Most of the superhumans in Marvel's Earth owe their powers to the Celestials, cosmic entities who visited Earth millions of years ago and experimented on their prehistoric ancestors (a process they also carried out on several other planets). This resulted in the creation of two hidden races, the godlike Eternals and the genetically unstable Deviants, in addition to giving some humans an "x-factor" in their genes, which sometimes activates naturally, resulting in sometimes superpowered, sometimes disfigured individuals called mutants. Others require other factors (such as radiation) for their powers to come forth. Depending on the genetic profile, individuals who are exposed to different chemicals or radiation will often suffer death or injury, while in others it will cause superhuman abilities to manifest. Except for psionic abilities, these powers are usually random; rarely do two people have the same set of powers. It is not clear why the Celestials did this, although it is known that they continue to observe humanity's evolution. A Marvel series titled Earth X explored one possible reason for this: that superhumans are meant to protect a Celestial embryo that grows inside Earth against any planetary threats and have done so for eons. An X-Men villain that is known as Vargas claims to be a new direction in human evolution, as he is born with superpowers even though his genetic profile said he was an ordinary human being. The majority of the public is unaware of what may cause superhuman powers.

Other possible origins for superhuman powers include magic, genetic manipulation and/or bionic implants. Some heroes and villains have no powers at all but depend instead on hand-to-hand combat training or advanced technological equipment. In the Marvel Universe, technology is considerably more advanced than in the real world; this is due to unique individuals of genius-level intelligence, such as Reed Richards (Mister Fantastic) of the Fantastic Four. However, most of the advanced devices (such as powered armor and death rays) are too expensive for the common citizen, and are usually in the hands of government organizations like S.H.I.E.L.D., or powerful criminal organizations like A.I.M. One major company producing these devices is Stark Industries, owned by Tony Stark (Iron Man), but there are others. Advanced technology has also been given to humans by hidden races, aliens, or time travelers like Kang the Conqueror, who is known to have influenced the robotics industry in the past.

In superhumans, the energy required for their superpowers either comes from within using their own body as a source or, if the demand of energy exceeds what their body is capable to deliver, comes from another source.

Marvel tries to explain most superpowers and their sources "scientifically", usually through the use of fictional science-like concepts, such as:
 Energy absorption (the battery effect); the cells in the body have the same function as batteries, being charged with energy that comes from an outer source. This is most often seen in gamma ray-exposed individuals such as the Hulk, who get their powers from this stored energy. The powers will remain as long as the energy is present, and can even be increased by filling the "batteries" even more. If the energy is emptied, the powers will fade away.
 The Power Primordial is a leftover force from Big Bang and is controlled by the Elders of the Universe.
 The Phoenix Force is an immortal, indestructible, and mutable manifestation of the prime universal force of life. Born of the void between states of being, it is the nexus of all psionic energy which does, has, and ever will exist in all realities of the Multiverse. It has been shown to favor mutant telepaths like Jean Grey.
 Psionic energy is a form of magic associated with the Astral Plane, which is assumed to be an invisible, unknown form of energy generated by living brains that can manipulate other forms of matter and energy. Apparently, it creates the universal psionic field, which is present everywhere in the universe, but only those with abilities to connect to it can make use of its energy.
 The Enigma Force is suspected to be connected to the Microverse and is also the source of its counterpart on Earth the Uni-Power, which transforms an individual into Captain Universe.
 Extradimensional space that can be tapped to pull mass from (to add to objects on Earth) or taken away from those objects and be stored in "pocket dimensions" to be retrieved later. This is how characters like the Hulk can grow and shrink with no visible absorption of mass. A type of subatomic particles called Pym particles can be used for these effects (Note: many giant-sized characters have a limited ability to manipulate gravity to handle their increased weight). The change in mass can be in the form of a density change instead, allowing a character to become harder or incorporeal. Some characters can seem to "transform" themselves (or others) into unliving substances, or even pure energy, by storing their bodies in extradimensional space and replacing them with bodies made from matter or energy from that dimension, while their souls remain on Earth, controlling their new body. Travel into other dimensions can also be used as a way to "teleport" by re-entering the Earth dimension at a different point.
 The Darkforce is an unknown, dark substance from another dimension (known simply as the Darkforce Dimension) that can be summoned and manipulated in many ways: to create impenetrable darkness, to solidify it in various forms, and (most notably) to absorb the "life energy" from living beings (not all users can use all these effects). The Darkforce can also be used to travel to and from its home dimension, but this is dangerous to all except those with Darkforce powers. Some believe that the Darkforce is sentient and sometimes has an evil influence on those who use it.  Various heroes and villains have versions of Darkforce powers, including Darkstar, the first Blackout, the Shroud, Cloak, the Doorman and Quagmire (of the Squadron Supreme Universe). Cloak seems to be the prime 'portal' to the Darkforce, however.
 The Lightforce is the opposite of the Darkforce: a form of energy that resembles light and also comes from its dimension, but has healing effects on living beings (except ones made of darkness or the Darkforce). It is unknown if it might be sentient. Cloak's partner, Dagger seems to be the Lightforce's main avatar.
 The Power Cosmic is a force that can alter reality, allowing the user to do whatever he or she wants (including bending the laws of physics), only being limited by how much cosmic energy the character can tap at a time. It seems to be part of the universe itself (as a kind of radiation) and is most prominently used by Galactus and his heralds.
 Magic is a conceptual system that allows individuals to control the natural world by utilizing certain universal energies, whose nature is generally beyond the scope of science. These energies have their source in extra-dimensional beings or different realms and dimensions, which have different properties to the main Universe. Magic has rules of its own to follow, which vary with the method of invocation, mainly in the form of spoken spells (which usually call certain extra-dimensional beings to borrow their power). It appears to be present in everything, even living beings. All humans in the Marvel Universe can use magic, but only if properly trained. Most people are unaware that magic works. Also, powerful magical beings from other dimensions have created specific, extremely powerful magical spells that they allow to be used (often indiscriminately) by those sorcerers who invoke their names; one example is the trinity of beings called the Vishanti, who serve as patrons to heroic sorcerers. At any given time, there is a sorcerer on Earth tasked to protect the universe against extra-dimensional mystical invaders; this sorcerer is known as the Sorcerer Supreme, an office left empty since the death of Brother Voodoo, but most recently has been reinstated to Doctor Strange.

Non-human
A degree of paranoid fear against mutants exists due to stories of mutants being a species or even a subspecies of humans (Homo superior or Homo sapiens superior) that is evolving and is meant to replace normal humans. This has caused organizations to form to deal with the problem, who can be divided into three camps: those who seek peaceful coexistence between mutants and normal humans (the X-Men and their affiliated groups), those who seek to control or eliminate humans to give mutants safety or dominance (Magneto and his followers, as well as other mutants such as Apocalypse), and those who seek to regulate or eliminate mutants in favor of humans. The latter often use the robots known as the Sentinels as weapons.  Certain species are regarded as subhuman, like the Morlocks, who lurk beneath New York City and have been discriminated against by the outside world because of their mutant deformities. The Morlocks have recently joined the terrorist organization Gene Nation.

In addition to mutants, Eternals, and Deviants, several other intelligent races have existed secretly on Earth. These include the Inhumans, another genetically unstable race (like the Deviants, but in their case, it is due to their use of a substance called the "Terrigen Mists") that was created by a Kree experiment long ago; the Subterraneans, a race of humanoids adapted to living below the surface, created by the Deviants (some Subterraneans were transformed into the 'Lava Men' by a demon); and Homo mermanus, a humanoid species of water-breathers that live in Earth's oceans. Most of these races have advanced technology but existed hidden from humanity until recent times. More variants of humanity can be found in the Savage Land (see Places below). Most of the Savage Land races have their origin from a group of primitive ape-men who seems to have escaped the Celestial experiments and whose influence is present in all modern Homo sapiens. Other leftovers from the era when primitive humanoids walked on Earth still exist, such as the radiation-altered Neanderthal man known as the Missing Link, an enemy of the Hulk.

Alien races

The Marvel Universe also contains hundreds of intelligent alien races. Earth has interacted with many of them because a major "hyperspace warp" happens to exist in the Solar System.

The three major space empires are:
 the Kree, who rule the Kree Empire (in the Greater Magellanic Cloud)
 the Skrulls, who rule the Skrull Empire (in the Andromeda Galaxy)
 the Shi'ar, who rule the Shi'ar Empire (no known real-world counterpart for its galaxy, but it might be in the Triangulum Galaxy)
The three are often in direct or indirect conflict, which occasionally involves Earth humans; in particular, the Kree and Skrulls are ancient enemies, and the Kree-Skrull War has involved humans on several occasions.

The Skrulls have also been known to be in a long and consistent war against the Majesdanians, who live on a milky planet named Majesdane. The war between the two had started after two Majesdanians, Frank and Leslie Dean of the Pride had been kicked out for criminal activities; the two traveled to Earth, where Frank and Leslie stopped the war against Earth in exchange for giving the Skrulls the location of Majesdane, which was hidden behind the corona of a white dwarf. The war had gone on for 16 years minimum; it ended abruptly after the Skrulls shot a barrage of missiles at Majesdane, who retaliated.

Another prominent alien race is the Watchers, immortal and wise beings who watch over the Marvel Universe and have taken a sacred vow not to intervene in events, though the Watcher assigned to Earth, Uatu, has violated this oath on several occasions.

The Elders of the Universe are ancient aliens who have often had a great impact on many worlds for billions of years, acting alone or as a group. A power called the Power Primordial is channeled through them.

Many other races exist and have formed an "Intergalactic Council" to have their say on matters that affect them all, such as interference from Earth humans in their affairs.

Supernatural creatures
Also abundant in the Marvel Universe are legendary creatures such as gods, demons and vampires. The 'gods' of most polytheistic pantheons are powerful, immortal human-like races residing in other dimensions who visited Earth in ancient times, and became the basis of many legends. However, all of these 'gods' share a common ancestry and connection to Earth due to Gaea, the primeval Elder Goddess that infused her life essence into all living things on Earth. Gaea is known by various names and appearances in other cultures and among the various pantheons, but she is the same being. As a result, she is a member of every polytheistic pantheon of 'gods' worshiped by humans. Besides mythological gods, many deities made up by Marvel writers exist as well, such as the Dark Gods, enemies of the Asgardians. The Dark Gods are a race of 'gods' that have been worshiped by extraterrestrial races. Well-known alien races like the Shi'ar and Skrulls also have beings they worship as 'gods', though little has been revealed about them.

Many persons and beings have falsely pretended to be gods or demons during history; in particular, none of the ones claiming to be major figures from Judeo-Christian beliefs have turned out to be the real article, although several angels have appeared in recent years, as well as an apparent true rebellion and expulsion of angels from a higher realm known as Paradise, proving that some form of Heaven and Hell do exist in this Universe, seemingly like those in keeping with common real-world religious belief. Similarly, demons are evil magical beings who take affairs in the matters of the universe. Some of the most powerful are Blackheart, Mephisto, Nightmare, Satannish, Thog the Nether-Spawn and Zom. There are also powerful benevolent mystical entities such as the Vishanti; or amoral and malevolent entities who are not truly demonic, such as Dormammu and the Octessence, or ones heavily drawing upon the mythologies of H. P. Lovecraft and Robert E. Howard. Some supernatural beings, entities and human characters created by Lovecraft and Howard, who were friends and influenced each other's work, have been adapted by Marvel and include Abdul Alhazred, Conan the Barbarian Nyarlathotep and Set. Some deities or demonic beings that are original characters of Marvel have been heavily influenced by these mythologies, such as Shuma-Gorath.

Most of the current generation of gods have been revealed to be the descendants of the Elder Goddess Gaea. The two most featured pantheons are the Asgardians (of whom Thor is a member) and the Olympians (of whom Hercules is a member). The lords of the various pantheons sometimes gather in groups known as either the Council of Godheads or the Council of Skyfathers. The gods were forced to stop meddling with humanity (at least openly) a thousand years ago by the Celestials, and most people today believe them to be fictional. Other pantheons have been depicted in the Marvel Universe that is still actively worshiped in the real world, including those worshiped by the Aboriginal inhabitants of Australia, the gods of Hinduism, the Shinto gods and the gods of Zoroastrianism. These deities are rarely depicted, however. One such appearance generated a good deal of controversy as the depiction involved a fight between Marvel's incarnation of Thor and the Hindu god Shiva, a battle which Shiva lost. As Shiva is one of the principal deities of Hindu religion, his defeat offended some followers of Hinduism. This battle was retconned later as having been the deity Indra, the Hindu god of thunder, who was posing as Shiva, that met defeat. To avoid offending the believers of still active religions, Marvel features such deities as characters in the background or who make very brief cameo appearances.

Marvel's depiction of vampires has been heavily influenced by various interpretations of popular media, such as Bram Stoker's Dracula. As with many other supernatural creatures, Marvel entwined the origin of vampires with aspects of the mythologies created by Lovecraft and Howard. They were created by magical rites performed by priests of Atlantis before the Great Cataclysm that destroyed much of the world, with Varnae becoming the first vampire. Marvel would depict vampires as frequent antagonists during the Hyborian Age to Howard characters such as Kull and Conan. In recent years, Marvel's depiction of vampires has altered greatly by creating various subspecies of vampires that exist in clans that greatly differ in appearance and belief. All vampires are depicted with varying degrees of superhuman strength, speed, stamina, agility, reflexes and accelerated healing. Many are capable of transforming into animals such as bats or wolves; some can transform into a mist-like substance; some of the most powerful are capable of controlling the weather to a somewhat limited degree. All vampires must ingest blood to maintain their survival and physical vitality. So long as they do so regularly, they cease to age and are immune to diseases. They retain the well-known vulnerabilities common to vampires in other media interpretations, including sunlight, garlic, religious icons and weapons made of silver. Vampires can be killed by a wooden stake driven through the heart, though they return to life if the stake is removed. Vampires are highly allergic to silver and can be killed with it. While they normally heal rapidly, injuries inflicted by silver weapons heal at a much slower rate if the injuries are not fatal. Vampires can also be killed by decapitation or being burned with fire, with burning them to ashes and then scattering the ashes being the most effective means of ensuring their demise (scattering the ashes is done so that the vampire cannot be mystically resurrected).

Cosmic entities
The cosmic entities are beings of unbelievably great levels of power (the weakest of whom can destroy entire planets) who exist to perform duties that maintain the existence of the universe. Most do not care at all about "lesser beings" such as humans, and as a consequence, their acts are recurrently dangerous to mortals. When dire threats threaten the universe, it is not uncommon for these beings to gather together to discuss the threat and even act on it.

Most conceptual entities are simply interested in furthering their essential function or to keep the balance with an opposing force. However, certain cosmic entities, such as Galactus, the In-Betweener, the Maelstrom, or the Stranger have demonstrated personality, motivations, or (except for the first one mentioned) even ambitions beyond their functions, but often maintain the perspective that morality is entirely relative, or that destroying civilizations of "lesser" beings is no eviler than if these beings destroyed an anthill. Others such as Uatu the Watcher, Eon, or the Celestials, Ashema and Tiamut are aberrations in the sense of sympathizing with, and occasionally coming to the defense of, humanity.

The Phoenix Force first received personification in Jean Grey. The Phoenix Force is composed of the psionic energy from all living beings' past, present, and future, and is an embodiment of rebirth and destructive transformation through "burning away what doesn't work", and helped to restart the universe before the Big Bang.

'The "Fulcrum" is a comparatively recent addition to the hierarchy, that "all" cosmic entities allegedly serve, of a level of raw power stated to far surpass the might of the Watchers and the Celestials. Unlike most other entities, it is capable of conscience, compassion, and even a sense of humor, and has stated that it wants other cosmic beings to develop such as well. He is a possible manifestation/avatar of the One-Above-All.

The mentioned One-Above-All is believed to be the supreme, omnipotent being, who solely created the Marvel Multiverse, and possibly acted beyond. He also brought to life the Living Tribunal, an extremely powerful cosmic entity, who serves to maintain balance within the Multiverse.

Cosmology

Multiverse

The Marvel Universe is part of a Multiverse, with various universes coexisting simultaneously, usually without affecting each other directly. Furthermore, each universe has various other dimensions associated with it, and one such group is collectively known as a Reality. Often what is referred to in the comics as a Universe is actually a Reality. According to mythology, the Multiverse has been created by the omnipotent being One-Above-All.

Even the Marvel Multiverse, however, is only a part of the Omniverse, which consists of all of fiction and reality combined, including all the works that are outside of Marvel's copyright restrictions.

The action of most of the Marvel Comics titles takes place in a continuity known as Earth-616. This continuity exists in a multiverse alongside trillions of alternative continuities. Alternative continuities in the Marvel Multiverse are generally defined in terms of their differences from Earth-616.

Continuities besides Earth-616 include the following (for a complete listing see Multiverse (Marvel Comics)):

Time

One cannot normally alter the Marvel Universe's history; if a time-traveler should cause an alteration to the established flow of events at some point in the past, a divergent universe will simply "branch out" from the existing timeline, and the time-traveler will still return to his or her unaltered original universe. Those realities can also spawn realities of their own. There exist hundreds, probably thousands of such realities. It is unknown why this happens, though a warp known as the Nexus of All Realities exists in a swamp in the Florida Everglades of Earth-616. For the most part, this does not matter, as most beings are unaware that this occurs, or even that their universes were recently "born" from another. However, individuals and organizations exist that try to monitor or manipulate the various realities. These include Immortus, the Captain Britain Corps, the Time Variance Authority, the Timebreakers/Exiles, and Kang the Conqueror's forces. It is possible to travel through time without creating a new alternative universe, instead of altering events in the future, but this seems to have devastating and very far-reaching repercussions, as depicted in Marvel 1602 (it almost destroyed the whole multiverse, including the afterlife).

Also, time itself passes much differently within the confines of the Marvel Universe than it does in the real world. Despite various characters having appeared within company publications for decades, few, if any, have aged to any appreciable degree. For example, the patriotic hero Captain America was created in 1941 but stopped appearing in titles soon after the end of World War II. The character was revived more than 20 years later, explained as having been frozen in a block of ice though believed to be dead, to lead Marvel's latest team of superheroes the Avengers. This first Avengers team featured several characters that would go on to be some of the company's most famous and most popular. Although the characters would be portrayed in hundreds and even thousands of adventures over the decades, they have been portrayed as having aged little or not at all.

Naturally, this tendency is purely due to story conveniences (or a somewhat haphazardly shifting patchwork pattern of authors), and mainly that the fictional "continuity" has been maintained and expanded far beyond what Stan Lee and others originally planned or hoped for. Hence, the passing of time was more discernible in the very early years, such as the graduation of Spider-Man; and what started as children or teenaged characters, such as Kitty Pryde, Franklin Richards, Valeria Richards, Power Pack, or the New Mutants are all allowed to age at wildly shifting rates (in the second case even backward at times), whereas surrounding characters somewhat dependent on a certain age limit do not change at all. This recurrently creates inherently contradictory effects, as events are routinely described to have happened several years ago, even in cases when this would mean that some of the involved characters would have been toddlers. Different approaches also exist regarding allowing "second-generation" descendants of heroes or villains, full-grown over 18 years after an event (for example, Hulkling, other members of the Young Avengers, the Runaways, and the Secret Warriors), whereas other books, such as Young Allies use the inherent contradiction to debunk similar claims. If a past storyline wherein a direct depiction of a then-current president or similar is referred to in a later era, it tends to become updated accordingly, sometimes with an "in-joke" acknowledgment.

A more recent explanation was given by Galactus to the Ultimates, namely that some important events – for instance, the creation of the Fantastic Four or the Avengers –  have a 'gravity' all their own and warp time around them, causing the timeline to subtly change to accommodate this.

Space

While the Marvel Universe is presumably as large as the non-fictional universe comic book readers inhabit, for all intents and purposes the Local Group is the universe; practically all action takes place in it. The Skrull Empire is located in the Andromeda Galaxy, the Kree Empire in the Greater Magellanic Cloud, which is a satellite of the Milky Way galaxy in which Earth, of course, is found, and the Shi´ar Empire is located somewhere between them in one of the smaller galaxies (perhaps the Triangulum Galaxy); frequently, these three empires are quoted as the main political powers "in the universe". Similarly, the Local Group seems to be the only affected area when the Annihilation Wave cut its bloody swath "across the universe".

Role-playing games
Four role-playing games have been set in the Marvel Universe:

 Marvel Super Heroes (TSR, 1984)
 Marvel Super Heroes Adventure Game (TSR, 1998)
 Marvel Universe Roleplaying Game (Marvel Comics, 2003)
 Marvel Heroic Roleplaying (Margaret Weis Productions, 2012)

See also
 Features of the Marvel Universe
 List of Marvel Comics alien races
 List of Marvel Comics characters
 List of Marvel Comics superhero debuts
 List of Marvel Comics teams and organizations
 Marvel Animated Universe (MAU)
 Publication history of Marvel Comics crossover events

References

External links
 Marvel Entertainment (official site)
 Marvel Chronology Project
 Marvel Universe—Archive of forums named after the Marvel Universe

 
Canons (fiction)
Fictional elements introduced in 1961
Fictional universes
Mythopoeia
Science fantasy comics
Science fantasy franchises
Superhero comics
Superhero franchises